Typhlodromus is a genus of predatory mites belonging to the family Phytoseiidae. Members of this genus feed largely on other mites, such as red spider mites, and several species that are popular as biological control agents to control these pests.

Species
 Typhlodromus acacia Xin, Liang & Ke, 1980
 Typhlodromus acaciae Schultz, 1973
 Typhlodromus accessorius Kolodochka, 1993
 Typhlodromus adenensis Ueckermann, 1996
 Typhlodromus admirabilis (Wainstein, 1978)
 Typhlodromus aenaulus Ueckermann, 1996
 Typhlodromus aestivalis Athias-Henriot, 1960
 Typhlodromus agilis (Chaudhri, 1975)
 Typhlodromus ailanthi Wang & Xu, 1985
 Typhlodromus aktherecus (Kolodochka, 1979)
 Typhlodromus algonquinensis Chant, Hansell & Yoshida-Shaul, 1974
 Typhlodromus americanus Chant & Yoshida-Shaul, 1989
 Typhlodromus andrei Karg, 1982
 Typhlodromus apoxys van der Merwe, 1968
 Typhlodromus applegum Schicha, 1983
 Typhlodromus argyronamus Ueckermann & Loots, 1988
 Typhlodromus arizonicus (Tuttle & Muma, 1973)
 Typhlodromus armiger Ehara & Amano, 1998
 Typhlodromus arunachalensis Gupta, 1986
 Typhlodromus astibus Ueckermann & Loots, 1984
 Typhlodromus asticus El-Banhawy & Abou-Awad, 1991
 Typhlodromus athenas Swirski & Ragusa, 1976
 Typhlodromus athiasae Porath & Swirski, 1965
 Typhlodromus atticus Swirski & Ragusa, 1976
 Typhlodromus auratus Ueckermann & Loots, 1988
 Typhlodromus baccettii Lombardini, 1960
 Typhlodromus bagdasarjani Wainstein & Arutunjan, 1967
 Typhlodromus bakeri (Garman, 1948)
 Typhlodromus balakotiensis (Chaudhri, Akbar & Rasool, 1974)
 Typhlodromus balanites El-Badry, 1967
 Typhlodromus bambusae Ehara, 1964
 Typhlodromus bambusicolus Gupta, 1977
 Typhlodromus banahawensis Schicha & Corpuz-Raros, 1992
 Typhlodromus beglarovi Kuznetsov, 1984
 Typhlodromus bergi Moraes & McMurtry, 1988
 Typhlodromus beskaravainyi (Kuznetsov, 1984)
 Typhlodromus betulae (Kolodochka, 1992)
 Typhlodromus bichaetae Karg, 1989
 Typhlodromus bifurcuta Wu, 1983
 Typhlodromus bondarenkoi (Arutunjan, 1973)
 Typhlodromus borealis Ehara, 1967
 Typhlodromus brevimedius Wu & Liu, 1991
 Typhlodromus brisbanensis Schicha, 1978
 Typhlodromus buccalis van der Merwe, 1968
 Typhlodromus bullatus van der Merwe, 1968
 Typhlodromus cannabis Ke & Xin, 1983
 Typhlodromus capparidis van der Merwe, 1968
 Typhlodromus caucasicus (Abbasova, 1970)
 Typhlodromus caudiglans Schuster, 1959
 Typhlodromus celastrus Ueckermann & Loots, 1988
 Typhlodromus cephalochaitosus Moraes, Oliveira & Zannou, 2001
 Typhlodromus cerasicolus (Wainstein & Vartapetov, 1972)
 Typhlodromus cervix Wu & Li, 1984
 Typhlodromus changi Tseng, 1975
 Typhlodromus channabasavannai Gupta, 1978
 Typhlodromus chanti Hirschmann, 1962
 Typhlodromus charactus Ueckermann, 1996
 Typhlodromus chazeaui Blommers, 1973
 Typhlodromus chinensis Ehara & Lee, 1971
 Typhlodromus chrysanthemi Gupta, 1977
 Typhlodromus clairathiasae Wainstein & Arutunjan, 1967
 Typhlodromus combretum McMurtry & Moraes, 1991
 Typhlodromus commenticius Livshitz & Kuznetsov, 1972
 Typhlodromus communis Gupta, 1980
 Typhlodromus concavus Wang & Xu, 1991
 Typhlodromus confusus Narayanan, Kaur & Ghai, 1960
 Typhlodromus coniferculus (Wainstein, 1978)
 Typhlodromus corticis Herbert, 1958
 Typhlodromus coryli Wu & Lan, 1991
 Typhlodromus coryphus Wu, 1985
 Typhlodromus cotoneastri Wainstein, 1961
 Typhlodromus crassus van der Merwe, 1968
 Typhlodromus creticus Stathakis & Papadoulis, 2012
 Typhlodromus cuii Wu & Ou, 1998
 Typhlodromus dactylifera (Chaudhri, Akbar & Rasool, 1974)
 Typhlodromus dalfardicus (Daneshvar, 1987)
 Typhlodromus dalii (Rather, 1984)
 Typhlodromus daresalaami El-Banhawy & Abou-Awad, 1991
 Typhlodromus darjeelingensis Gupta, 1986
 Typhlodromus dasiphorae Wu & Lan, 1991
 Typhlodromus datongensis Wang & Xu, 1991
 Typhlodromus deleoni (Denmark & Muma, 1975)
 Typhlodromus denarus Schicha & Corpuz-Raros, 1992
 Typhlodromus denmarki (Rather, 1984)
 Typhlodromus diumbokus Schicha & Corpuz-Raros, 1992
 Typhlodromus divergentis (Chaudhri, Akbar & Rasool, 1974)
 Typhlodromus doreenae Schicha, 1987
 Typhlodromus dossei Schicha, 1978
 Typhlodromus drori Grinberg & Amitai, 1970
 Typhlodromus drymis Ueckermann & Loots, 1988
 Typhlodromus eddiei Ueckermann & Loots, 1988
 Typhlodromus egypticus El-Badry, 1967
 Typhlodromus elisae Schicha & McMurtry, 1986
 Typhlodromus elmassri Bayan, 1988
 Typhlodromus eremicus Ueckermann, in Meyer & Ueckermann 1989
 Typhlodromus eremitidis (Chaudhri, Akbar & Rassol, 1974)
 Typhlodromus ernesti Ragusa & Swirski, 1978
 Typhlodromus evectus (Schuster, 1966)
 Typhlodromus februs van der Merwe, 1968
 Typhlodromus fleschneri Chant, 1960
 Typhlodromus foenilis Oudemans, 1930
 Typhlodromus foraminosus (Schuster, 1966)
 Typhlodromus fujianensis Wu & Liu, 1991
 Typhlodromus galummatus (Chaudhri, Akbar & Rassol, 1974)
 Typhlodromus gardeniae Schultz, 1973
 Typhlodromus garhwalicus Gupta, 1982
 Typhlodromus georgicus Wainstein, 1958
 Typhlodromus ghanii (Muma, 1967)
 Typhlodromus gopali Gupta, 1969
 Typhlodromus gouaniae Schicha, 1983
 Typhlodromus gracilentus Tseng, 1975
 Typhlodromus grastis Ueckermann & Loots, 1988
 Typhlodromus gressitti McMurtry & Moraes, 1985
 Typhlodromus griekwensis Schultz, 1973
 Typhlodromus guangdongensis Wu & Lan, 1994
 Typhlodromus guangxiensis Wu, Lan & Zeng, 1997
 Typhlodromus gulingensis Zhu, 1985
 Typhlodromus gutierrezi Blommers, 1973
 Typhlodromus hadii Chaudhri, 1965
 Typhlodromus hadzhievi (Abbasova, 1970)
 Typhlodromus haiastanius (Arutunjan, 1977)
 Typhlodromus halinae (Wainstein & Kolodochka, 1974)
 Typhlodromus haramotoi Prasad, 1968
 Typhlodromus hartlandrowei Evans, 1958
 Typhlodromus hebetis (De Leon, 1959)
 Typhlodromus hibernus Wang & Xu, 1991
 Typhlodromus higoensis Ehara, 1985
 Typhlodromus himalayensis Gupta, 1981
 Typhlodromus hirashimai Ehara, 1972
 Typhlodromus homalii Gupta, 1970
 Typhlodromus hui Wu, 1987
 Typhlodromus hungaricus Bozai, 1997
 Typhlodromus ilicis Athias-Henriot, 1960
 Typhlodromus incasus (Chaudhri, 1975)
 Typhlodromus incertus Athias-Henriot, 1960
 Typhlodromus incisivus van der Merwe, 1968
 Typhlodromus inhabilis Kuznetsov, 1984
 Typhlodromus inopinatus (Wainstein, 1975)
 Typhlodromus inops (De Leon, 1967)
 Typhlodromus insularis Ehara, 1966
 Typhlodromus intercalaris Livshitz & Kuznetsov, 1972
 Typhlodromus intermedius Wu, 1988
 Typhlodromus invectus Chant, 1959
 Typhlodromus involutus Livshitz & Kuznetsov, 1972
 Typhlodromus iranensis (Denmark & Daneshvar, 1982)
 Typhlodromus johannae Ueckermann & Loots, 1988
 Typhlodromus jordanis (Rivnay & Swirski, 1980)
 Typhlodromus kadii Kandeel & El-Halawany, 1985
 Typhlodromus kadonoi Ehara, in Ehara, Okada & Kato 1994
 Typhlodromus kashmiricus Gupta, 1981
 Typhlodromus kazachstanicus Wainstein, 1958
 Typhlodromus kazimiae (Denmark & Muma, 1978)
 Typhlodromus kerkirae Swirski & Ragusa, 1976
 Typhlodromus khosrovensis Arutunjan, 1971
 Typhlodromus kiso Ehara, 1972
 Typhlodromus klimenkoi Kolodochka, 1980
 Typhlodromus knisleyi Denmark, 1992
 Typhlodromus kodaikanalensis Gupta, 1978
 Typhlodromus kolodochkai (Denmark & Welbourn, 2002)
 Typhlodromus krimbasi Papadoulis & Emmanouel, 1997
 Typhlodromus kutabus Schicha & Corpuz-Raros, 1992
 Typhlodromus kuznetsovi (Denmark & Welbourn, 2002)
 Typhlodromus kykladiticus Papadoulis & Emmanouel, 1993
 Typhlodromus lalazariensis (Chaudhri, 1975)
 Typhlodromus lanyuensis Tseng, 1975
 Typhlodromus lataniae El-Badry, 1968
 Typhlodromus lateris Wu, Lan & Liu, 1995
 Typhlodromus laurae Arutunjan, 1974
 Typhlodromus leptodactylus Wainstein, 1961
 Typhlodromus libitus (Chaudhri, 1975)
 Typhlodromus limitatus (Chaudhri, Akbar & Rasool, 1979)
 Typhlodromus linzhiensis Wu, 1987
 Typhlodromus longa (Denmark & Knisley, 1978)
 Typhlodromus longicervix Wu & Liu, 1997
 Typhlodromus longipalpus Swirski & Ragusa, 1976
 Typhlodromus lootsi Schultz, 1972
 Typhlodromus loralaiana (Muma, 1967)
 Typhlodromus lushanensis Zhu, 1985
 Typhlodromus luzonensis Schicha & Corpuz-Raros, 1992
 Typhlodromus machaon (Wainstein, 1977)
 Typhlodromus macroides Zhu, 1985
 Typhlodromus macrum Ke & Xin, 1983
 Typhlodromus magdalenae Pritchard & Baker, 1962
 Typhlodromus majumderi Gupta, 1986
 Typhlodromus malicolus Wainstein & Arutunjan, 1967
 Typhlodromus mangiferus Zaher & El-Brollosy, in Zaher 1986
 Typhlodromus manipurensis Gupta, 1977
 Typhlodromus maracus (Chaudhri, 1975)
 Typhlodromus marinus Wu & Liu, 1991
 Typhlodromus maspalomensis Ferragut & Pena-Estevez, 2003
 Typhlodromus matthyssei Ueckermann & Loots, 1988
 Typhlodromus meerutensis (Ghai & Menon, 1969)
 Typhlodromus meritus (Wainstein, 1978)
 Typhlodromus mesasiaticus Wainstein, 1962
 Typhlodromus michaeli Ueckermann & Loots, 1988
 Typhlodromus microbullatus van der Merwe, 1968
 Typhlodromus miyarai Ehara, 1967
 Typhlodromus monosetus Wang & Xu, 1991
 Typhlodromus montanus Chant & Yoshida-Shaul, 1978
 Typhlodromus morellensis Ferragut, 1991
 Typhlodromus mori Gupta, 1981
 Typhlodromus moroccoensis Denmark, 1992
 Typhlodromus muliebris van der Merwe, 1968
 Typhlodromus namaquaensis Ueckermann & Loots, 1988
 Typhlodromus ndibu Pritchard & Baker, 1962
 Typhlodromus neobakeri Prasad, 1968
 Typhlodromus neocrassus Tseng, 1983
 Typhlodromus neorhenanus Gupta, 1977
 Typhlodromus neotransvaalensis Gupta, 1978
 Typhlodromus neyshabouris (Denmark & Daneshvar, 1982)
 Typhlodromus nilgiriensis Gupta, 1986
 Typhlodromus nobilis (Kuznetsov, 1984)
 Typhlodromus norvegicus Edland & Evans, 1998
 Typhlodromus oasis El-Badry, 1968
 Typhlodromus obesus Tseng, 1983
 Typhlodromus occiduus (Karg, 1990)
 Typhlodromus octavus (Chaudhri, Akbar & Rassol, 1974)
 Typhlodromus olympicus Papadoulis & Emmanouel, 1993
 Typhlodromus ordinatur (Kuznetsov, 1984)
 Typhlodromus orientalis Wu, 1981
 Typhlodromus orissaensis Gupta, 1977
 Typhlodromus ornata (Denmark & Muma, 1973)
 Typhlodromus ornatulus (Chaudhri, 1975)
 Typhlodromus paganus van der Merwe, 1968
 Typhlodromus paraevectus Moraes & McMurtry, 1983
 Typhlodromus parinopinatus (Evans & Edland, 1998)
 Typhlodromus pegazzani Ragusa & Swirski, 1978
 Typhlodromus pentelicus Papadoulis & Emmanouel, 1990
 Typhlodromus persianus McMurtry, 1977
 Typhlodromus persicus Gupta, 1992
 Typhlodromus personatus Karg, 1989
 Typhlodromus phialatus Athias-Henriot, 1960
 Typhlodromus philippinensis Corpuz-Raros, 1966
 Typhlodromus phylaktioticus Papadoulis & Emmanouel, 1990
 Typhlodromus pineus Wu & Li, 1984
 Typhlodromus pirianykae (Wainstein, 1972)
 Typhlodromus platycladus Xin, Liang & Ke, 1980
 Typhlodromus ponticus (Kolodochka, 1992)
 Typhlodromus porathi Swirski & Amitai, 1967
 Typhlodromus porus Wu, 1988
 Typhlodromus povtari (Kolodochka, 1988)
 Typhlodromus praeacutus van der Merwe, 1968
 Typhlodromus pruni Gupta, 1970
 Typhlodromus pseudopyri Ehara & Amano, 1998
 Typhlodromus pseudoserrulatus Tseng, 1983
 Typhlodromus psyllakisi Swirski & Ragusa, 1976
 Typhlodromus pyri Scheuten, 1857
 Typhlodromus qianshanensis Wu, 1988
 Typhlodromus quadratoides Wu & Liu, 1997
 Typhlodromus quadratus Wu & Liu, 1997
 Typhlodromus quercicolus Denmark, 1992
 Typhlodromus rapidus Wainstein & Arutunjan, 1968
 Typhlodromus rarus Wainstein, 1961
 Typhlodromus rasilis van der Merwe, 1968
 Typhlodromus recki Wainstein, 1958
 Typhlodromus religiosus Ueckermann & Loots, 1988
 Typhlodromus repens (Beglyarov, 1981)
 Typhlodromus rhenanoides Athias-Henriot, 1960
 Typhlodromus rhenanus (Oudemans, 1905)
 Typhlodromus rhododendroni Gupta, 1978
 Typhlodromus ribei Ke & Xin, 1983
 Typhlodromus richteri Karg, 1970
 Typhlodromus rickeri Chant, 1960
 Typhlodromus rivulus (Karg, 1991)
 Typhlodromus rodovae Wainstein & Arutunjan, 1968
 Typhlodromus rodriguezi (Denmark & Daneshvar, 1982)
 Typhlodromus roshanlali Narayanan & Ghai, 1963
 Typhlodromus rubetum (Wainstein, 1972)
 Typhlodromus ryukyuensis Ehara, 1967
 Typhlodromus sabelisi Ferla, N.J.; Silva, G.L. da; Nascimento, J.M. do 2012
 Typhlodromus saevus van der Merwe, 1968
 Typhlodromus salviae (Kolodochka, 1979)
 Typhlodromus samliensis (Chaudhri, 1975)
 Typhlodromus sapiens Athias-Henriot, 1960
 Typhlodromus sapphicus Ragusa & Tsolakis, 1998
 Typhlodromus serratosus El-Halawany & Abdel-Samad, 1990
 Typhlodromus serratus (Chaudhri, 1975)
 Typhlodromus serrulatus Ehara, 1972
 Typhlodromus setubali Dosse, 1961
 Typhlodromus shibai Ehara, 1981
 Typhlodromus sica (Chaudhri, Akbar & Rassol, 1974)
 Typhlodromus sijiensis Gupta, 1986
 Typhlodromus silvanus Ehara & Kishimoto, in Ehara, Okada & Kato 1994
 Typhlodromus singularis Chant, 1957
 Typhlodromus sonprayagensis Gupta, 1985
 Typhlodromus spectatus (Kolodochka, 1992)
 Typhlodromus spiralis (Wainstein & Kolodochka, 1974)
 Typhlodromus subarcticus Chant, Hansell & Yoshida-Shaul, 1974
 Typhlodromus subequalis Wu, 1988
 Typhlodromus submarinus Wu, Lan & Zeng, 1997
 Typhlodromus sudanicus El-Badry, 1967
 Typhlodromus suecicus (Sellnick, 1958)
 Typhlodromus swirskii Denmark, 1992
 Typhlodromus sycomorus Zaher & Shehata, 1969
 Typhlodromus taishanensis Wang & Xu, 1985
 Typhlodromus tamaricis (Kolodochka, 1982)
 Typhlodromus tardus (Kuznetsov, 1984)
 Typhlodromus tecoma (Denmark & Evans, 1999)
 Typhlodromus tenuis (Kuznetsov, 1984)
 Typhlodromus ternatus Ehara, 1972
 Typhlodromus terrulentis van der Merwe, 1968
 Typhlodromus thailandicus Ehara & Bhandhufalck, 1977
 Typhlodromus theroni Ueckermann & Loots, 1988
 Typhlodromus thesbites (Swirski & Amitai, 1997)
 Typhlodromus tiliae Oudemans, 1929
 Typhlodromus torbatejamae (Denmark & Daneshvar, 1982)
 Typhlodromus totifolianensis El-Banhawy & Abou-Awad, 1991
 Typhlodromus transvaalensis (Nesbitt, 1951)
 Typhlodromus tridentiger Tseng, 1975
 Typhlodromus tubifer Wainstein, 1961
 Typhlodromus ulmi Wang & Xu, 1985
 Typhlodromus umbraculus Ueckermann & Loots, 1988
 Typhlodromus umbratus (Chaudhri, Akbar & Rassol, 1974)
 Typhlodromus verbenae Wu & Lan, 1994
 Typhlodromus vescus van der Merwe, 1968
 Typhlodromus viniferae (Rather, 1987)
 Typhlodromus votivus (Meshkov, 1990)
 Typhlodromus vulgaris Ehara, 1959
 Typhlodromus wainsteini (Abbasova, 1970)
 Typhlodromus werneri Schultz, 1973
 Typhlodromus wichmanni Hirschmann, 1962
 Typhlodromus wonkooi Ryu & Ehara, 1992
 Typhlodromus wrenschae Ueckermann & Loots, 1988
 Typhlodromus xingchengensis Wu, Lan & Zhang, 1992
 Typhlodromus xini Wu, 1983
 Typhlodromus xinjiangensis Wu & Li, 1987
 Typhlodromus xiufui Wu & Liu, 1997
 Typhlodromus xizangensis Wu & Lan, 1994
 Typhlodromus yamashitai Ehara, 1972
 Typhlodromus yasumatsui Ehara, 1966
 Typhlodromus yinchuanensis Liang & Hu, 1988
 Typhlodromus yphlodromus (kikuyuensis Swirski & Ragusa, 1978)
 Typhlodromus zafari Chaudhri, 1965
 Typhlodromus zaheri Denmark, 1992
 Typhlodromus zhangyensis Wang & Xu, 1991
 Typhlodromus zhaoi Wu & Li, 1983

References

External links

Phytoseiidae